Lucerna Palace is an entertainment and shopping complex in the New Town quarter of Prague, Czech Republic. In 2017, it was named a national cultural monument.

Design and construction
The building, nestled between Štěpánská and Vodičkova streets, was constructed between 1907 and 1921, based on a design by Stanislav Bechyně. The work was carried out by Vácslav Havel (grandfather of former President of the Czech Republic Václav Havel). Originally intended to serve as a hockey stadium, it was reworked into a large social hall as the dimensions were soon found to be unsuited for its initial planned purpose. At the time, it was unique due to being one of the first reinforced concrete buildings in Prague. The edifice bears significant features of the waning Art Nouveau style and the emerging Modernism. In addition to its Great Hall, the complex also houses the Marble Hall, the Lucerna Music Bar, a movie theatre, a café, and a prominent pedestrian walkway, or "passage", connecting Štěpánská to Vodičkova street. Lucerna is one of twenty-six buildings in Prague with a functional paternoster lift.

Uses
From its inauguration until the present day, Lucerna has been an important cultural and social centre of the national capital, both in the former Czechoslovakia and the Czech Republic, hosting concerts, balls, conferences, fashion shows, and sporting events. Over time, some of the most prominent local and international artists have performed at the venue.

After the Velvet Revolution of 1989, Lucerna Palace was returned in restitution to the Havel family and is now owned by Václav Havel's widow, Dagmar Havlová.

National cultural monument
The complex has been listed as a cultural monument since 1976. In 2017, it was named a national cultural monument.

Gallery

References

External links

 
 Lucerna Palace Great Hall official website
 Lucerna Music Bar official website

National Cultural Monuments of the Czech Republic
Culture in Prague
Tourist attractions in Prague
1921 establishments in Czechoslovakia
Houses in the Czech Republic
Art Nouveau architecture in Prague
Art Nouveau houses
Modernist architecture in the Czech Republic
Concert halls in the Czech Republic
Prague 1